The North Region Junior Football League is a football league based in the north east of Scotland. The league sits at levels 6–7 on the Scottish football league system, acting as a feeder to the Highland Football League.

Geographically, the league covers Aberdeen City, Aberdeenshire and Moray.

The winners take part in an end of season promotion play-off with the Midlands Football League and North Caledonian Football League champions, subject to clubs meeting the required licensing criteria.

From 2018 to 2022, the league consisted of three divisions at Tiers 6 to 8. The 2018 league was essentially a continuation of a two division system which operated from 2003. It was split into two geographical sections at Tier 7 from 2011, with the lower (Tier 8) Division Two disbanded two years later. After five seasons of that setup, a three-division model was restored.

North Region Junior Football League Premier Division

The North Region Junior Football League Premier Division (also known as the McBookie.com North Region Premier Division for sponsorship reasons) is the highest division of the North Region of the Scottish Junior Football Association. It was established (as the North Region Superleague) in 2001 and since 2007, the league champions have qualified for the following season's Scottish Cup.

Member clubs for the 2021–22 season
Beginning from the 2013–14 season, the two automatically relegated clubs drop into one of two regional divisions below the North Superleague. In 2016–17 and 2017–18, a play-off was introduced between the third bottom Superleague side and the runners-up in the East and West sections of the North First Division, potentially adding a third relegation place. Subsequently, there has been automatic relegation only in a deregionalised league system.

Membership of the North Region Premier Division is dependent on more stringent ground criteria than the general entry requirements to the North Region and in recent years, both Inverness City (twice), and Grantown were refused promotion to the North Superleague on this basis.

Champions and season summaries

North Region Junior Football League Championship

The North Region Junior Football League Championship (known as the McBookie.com North Region Championship for sponsorship reasons) is the second tier of the North Region of the Scottish Junior Football Association. Clubs at the end of the season are promoted to the North Region Junior Football League Premier Division.

Member clubs for the 2021–22 season

Champions

References

1
Football in Aberdeen
Football in Aberdeenshire
Football in Highland (council area)
Football in Moray
Sports leagues established in 2001
2001 establishments in Scotland
Sixth level football leagues in Europe
2
2018 establishments in Scotland
Sports leagues established in 2018
Seventh level football leagues in Europe